The second round of AFC matches for 2018 FIFA World Cup qualification (and 2019 AFC Asian Cup qualification) was played from 24 May 2015 to 29 March 2016.

Format
A total of forty teams (teams ranked 1–34 in the AFC entrant list and six first round winners) were divided into eight groups of five teams to play home-and-away round-robin matches. The eight group winners and the four best group runners-up advanced to the third round of FIFA World Cup qualification as well as qualify for the 2019 AFC Asian Cup finals.

A total of 24 teams eliminated from World Cup qualification in the second round competed in the third round of 2019 AFC Asian Cup qualification (which was separated from the third round of 2018 FIFA World Cup qualification), where they were divided into six groups of four teams and competed for the remaining slots of the 2019 AFC Asian Cup. The 24 teams consisted of the sixteen highest ranked teams eliminated in the second round, and the eight teams that advanced from the play-off round of 2019 AFC Asian Cup qualification which were contested by the remaining twelve teams eliminated in the second round.

Seeding
The draw for the second round was held on 14 April 2015, at 17:00 MST (UTC+8), at the JW Marriott Hotel in Kuala Lumpur, Malaysia.

The seeding was based on the FIFA World Rankings of April 2015 (shown in parentheses below). The 40 teams were seeded into five pots:
Pot 1 contained the teams ranked 1–8.
Pot 2 contained the teams ranked 9–16.
Pot 3 contained the teams ranked 17–24.
Pot 4 contained the teams ranked 25–32.
Pot 5 contained the teams ranked 33–40.

Each group contained one team from each of the five pots. The fixtures of each group were automatically decided based on the respective pot of each team.

As the seeding order was based on the most recent FIFA Rankings prior to the draw, it differed from the order in the AFC entrant list, which was based on the FIFA World Rankings of January 2015. Among the six first round winners, three were seeded higher than pot 5 (India in pot 3, Timor-Leste and Bhutan in pot 4), on the basis of ranking points gained from the first round matches, while the other three (Yemen, Cambodia and Chinese Taipei) were seeded in pot 5.

Notes
Bolded teams qualified for the third round.
(D): Disqualified after draw

Groups

Group A

Group B

Group C

Group D

Group E

Group F
Indonesia was also drawn into this group, but on 30 May 2015 the country's football association was suspended due to governmental interference, and on 3 June 2015 the team was disqualified and all matches involving it were cancelled.

Group G

Group H

Ranking of runner-up teams
To determine the four best runner-up teams, the following criteria were used:
 Points (3 points for a win, 1 point for a draw, 0 points for a loss)
 Goal difference
 Goals scored
 Fair play points
 Drawing of lots

As a result of Indonesia being disqualified by FIFA suspension, Group F contained only four teams compared to five teams in all other groups. Therefore, the results against the fifth-placed team were not counted when determining the ranking of the runner-up teams.

Ranking of fourth-placed teams
To determine the four best fourth-placed teams, the following criteria were used:
 Points (3 points for a win, 1 point for a draw, 0 points for a loss)
 Goal difference
 Goals scored
 Fair play points
 Drawing of lots

As a result of Indonesia being disqualified by FIFA suspension, Group F contained only four teams compared to five teams in all other groups. Therefore, the results against the fifth-placed team were not counted when determining the ranking of the fourth-placed teams.

Goalscorers
There were 507 goals scored in 149 matches, for an average of  goals per match.

14 goals

 Mohammad Al-Sahlawi

11 goals

 Ahmed Khalil

8 goals

 Tim Cahill
 Yang Xu

7 goals

 Sardar Azmoun
 Omar Khribin

6 goals

 Yu Dabao
 Keisuke Honda
 Hamza Al-Dardour
 Son Heung-min
 Manuchekhr Dzhalilov

5 goals

 Tom Rogic
 Mehdi Taremi
 Shinji Kagawa
 Hassan Abdel-Fattah
 Ali Ashfaq
 Hassan Al-Haydos
 Taisir Al-Jassim
 Ali Mabkhout
 Sardor Rashidov

4 goals

 Mile Jedinak
 Younis Mahmoud
 Shinji Okazaki
 Abdallah Deeb
 Bader Al-Mutawa
 Yousef Nasser
 Anton Zemlianukhin
 Ahmad Abu Nahyeh
 Boualem Khoukhi
 Mohammed Muntari
 Mohammed Musa
 Osama Omari
 Igor Sergeev

3 goals

 Nathan Burns
 Jiang Ning
 Maya Yoshida
 Khampheng Sayavutthi
 Ri Hyok-chol
 Jong Il-gwan
 Jonathan Cantillana
 Tamer Seyam
 Misagh Bahadoran
 Ali Assadalla
 Yahya Al-Shehri
 Safuwan Baharudin
 Fazrul Nawaz
 Kwon Chang-hoon
 Lee Jae-sung
 Mahmoud Al-Mawas
 Sanharib Malki
 Teerasil Dangda
 Arslanmyrat Amanow
 Omar Abdulrahman
 Odil Ahmedov
 Lê Công Vinh

2 goals

 Khaibar Amani
 Norlla Amiri
 Mustafa Zazai
 Massimo Luongo
 Mark Milligan
 Aaron Mooy
 Ismail Abdullatif
 Abdulwahab Al-Malood
 Sayed Mohamed Adnan
 Tshering Dorji
 Chencho Gyeltshen
 Wang Yongpo
 Wu Lei
 Yu Hanchao
 Wu Chun-ching
 Godfred Karikari
 Lam Ka Wai
 Jaimes McKee
 Sunil Chhetri
 Ashkan Dejagah
 Ehsan Hajsafi
 Ali Adnan
 Justin Meram
 Mu Kanazaki
 Vitalij Lux
 Hassan Chaito
 Hassan Maatouk
 Aung Thu
 Pak Kwang-ryong
 Amad Al-Hosni
 Ahmed Mubarak Al-Mahaijri
 Abdulaziz Al-Muqbali
 Jaka Ihbeisheh
 Sameh Maraaba
 Yashir Pinto
 Iain Ramsay
 Karim Boudiaf
 Mohammed Kasola
 Fahad Al-Muwallad
 Khairul Amri
 Jang Hyun-soo
 Ki Sung-yueng
 Koo Ja-cheol
 Suk Hyun-jun
 Abdelrazaq Al Hussain
 Raja Rafe
 Akhtam Nazarov
 Pokklaw Anan
 Theerathon Bunmathan
 Adisak Kraisorn
 Mongkol Tossakrai
 Ramon Saro
 Guwanç Abylow
 Alexander Geynrikh
 Anzur Ismailov
 Nguyễn Văn Toàn
 Ahmed Al-Sarori

1 goal

 Faysal Shayesteh
 Josef Shirdel
 Mathew Leckie
 Tommy Oar
 Sami Al-Husaini
 Hussain Ali Baba
 Mohamed Al Romaihi
 Abdullah Omar
 Jahid Hasan Ameli
 Biren Basnet
 Sos Suhana
 Huang Bowen
 Mei Fang
 Zhang Linpeng
 Zhang Xizhe
 Hung Kai-chun
 Wen Chih-hao
 Yaki Yen
 Brandon McDonald
 Travis Nicklaw
 Christian Annan
 Bai He
 Chan Siu Ki
 Ju Yingzhi
 Lo Kwan Yee
 Paulinho
 Xu Deshuai
 Sandesh Jhingan
 Jeje Lalpekhlua
 Robin Singh
 Karim Ansarifard
 Saeid Ezatolahi
 Jalal Hosseini
 Alireza Jahanbakhsh
 Kamal Kamyabinia
 Morteza Pouraliganji
 Ramin Rezaeian
 Masoud Shojaei
 Andranik Teymourian
 Mehdi Torabi
 Mohannad Abdul-Raheem
 Ali Hosni
 Dhurgham Ismail
 Mahdi Kamel
 Ahmed Yasin
 Genki Haraguchi
 Hiroshi Kiyotake
 Masato Morishige
 Takashi Usami
 Munther Abu Amarah
 Yaseen Al-Bakhit
 Yousef Al-Naber
 Yousef Al-Rawashdeh
 Baha' Faisal
 Ahmed Samir
 Ali Maqseed
 Aziz Mashaan
 Faisal Zayid
 Ildar Amirov
 Edgar Bernhardt
 Bakhtiyar Duyshobekov
 Almazbek Mirzaliev
 Roda Antar
 Abbas Ahmed Atwi
 Hilal El-Helwe
 Mohammed Ghaddar
 Ali Hamam
 Youssef Mohamad
 Joan Oumari
 Feiz Shamsin
 Mohd Amri Yahyah
 Baddrol Bakhtiar
 Mohd Safiq Rahim
 Safee Sali
 Asadhulla Abdulla
 Ahmed Nashid
 Ahmed Niyaz
 Kyaw Ko Ko
 Kyaw Zayar Win
 Suan Lam Mang
 Zaw Min Tun
 Jang Kuk-chol
 Ro Hak-su
 So Hyon-uk
 So Kyong-jin
 Mohammed Al-Ghassani
 Saad Al-Mukhaini
 Qasim Said
 Raed Ibrahim Saleh
 Musab Al-Battat
 Ahmed Awad
 Abdelatif Bahdari
 Matías Jadue
 Pablo Tamburrini
 Khader Yousef
 Manuel Ott
 Javier Patiño
 Stephan Schröck
 Akram Afif
 Abdelkarim Hassan
 Ahmed Abdul Maqsoud
 Ismaeel Mohammad
 Sebastián Soria
 Salman Al-Faraj
 Osama Hawsawi
 Naif Hazazi
 Faris Ramli
 Lee Chung-yong
 Lee Jeong-hyeop
 Nam Tae-hee
 Moayad Ajan
 Oday Al-Jafal
 Ahmad Kallasi
 Omar Midani
 Fatkhullo Fatkhuloev
 Tana Chanabut
 Kroekrit Thaweekarn
 Serdaraly Ataýew
 Artur Geworkýan
 Ruslan Mingazow
 Süleýman Muhadow
 Mekan Saparow
 Mohamed Ahmed
 Ismail Al Hammadi
 Ahmed Al Hashmi
 Dawood Ali
 Habib Fardan
 Mohanad Salem
 Stanislav Andreev
 Server Djeparov
 Azizbek Haydarov
 Eldor Shomurodov
 Đinh Tiến Thành
 Trần Phi Sơn

1 own goal

 Sharif Mukhammad
 Khoun Laboravy
 Leng Makara
 Ildar Amirov
 Valery Kichin
 Ali Hamam
 Zaw Min Tun
 Hamdi Al Masri
 Serdar Annaorazow
 Mekan Saparow
 Đinh Tiến Thành

Notes

References

External links

Qualifiers – Asia: Round 2, FIFA.com
FIFA World Cup, the-AFC.com
, the-AFC.com
Preliminary Joint Qualification 2018, stats.the-AFC.com

2
2
Qual2
Qual2
Iran at the 2018 FIFA World Cup
South Korea at the 2018 FIFA World Cup
Japan at the 2018 FIFA World Cup
Saudi Arabia at the 2018 FIFA World Cup
Australia at the 2018 FIFA World Cup